Ursinia punctata is a species of plant belonging to the daisy family. It is found growing in South Africa, where it has a wide distribution.

Description 
This erect or sprawling shrub has lightly hairy pinnatisect leaves (leaves that are split nearly to the midrib but do not form distinct leaflets). Solitary yellow flowerheads are borne on long wiry stems. The flowers are present in spring and summer - between September and March.  It may be confused with Ursinia laciniata, although this species has a completely different distribution, or Ursinia glandulosa, which has unique stalked glands on the leaves and branches.

Distribution and habitat 
This species is endemic to South Africa, where it grows in the Northern Cape and Western Cape provinces. It is found growing from the Bokkeveld Mountains to Worcester and Swartberg where it grows on sandstone slopes.

References 

Plants described in 1887
Fauna of South Africa
Anthemideae